Plagiobothrys chorisianus is a species of flowering plant in the borage family known by the common name artist's popcornflower. It is endemic to California, where it can be found in and around the San Francisco Bay Area and parts of the coastline to the south.

It is a resident of chaparral, coastal scrub and grassland habitat. It is an annual herb with a spreading or erect stem  in length.

This species is sometimes divided into varieties.

External links
Calflora Database: Plagiobothrys chorisianus (Artist's popcornflower)
 Jepson Manual eFlora (TJM2) treatment of Plagiobothrys chorisianus
UC Photos gallery

chorisianus
Endemic flora of California
Natural history of the California chaparral and woodlands
Natural history of the California Coast Ranges
Endemic flora of the San Francisco Bay Area
Flora without expected TNC conservation status